Piscataway Creek is an  tributary of the Potomac River in Prince George's County, Maryland. The creek is a tidal arm of the Potomac for its final , entering the Potomac at Fort Washington Park. The United States Geological Survey records two variant names for Piscataway Creek: Pascattawaye Creek and Puscattuway Creeke.

The Fort Washington Light was built to provide guidance for mariners entering Piscataway Creek from the Potomac River.

See also 
 List of Maryland rivers

References

External links 
 U.S. Geological Survey water data for Piscataway Creek at Piscataway, Maryland
 NOAA nautical chart 12289
 National Park Service – Piscataway Park

Rivers of Prince George's County, Maryland
Rivers of Maryland
Tributaries of the Potomac River